Iuka is an unincorporated community in Livingston County, Kentucky, United States.

References

Unincorporated communities in Livingston County, Kentucky
Unincorporated communities in Kentucky